Ernsthof Solar Park is a photovoltaic power station near Dörlesberg, Wertheim, Germany. It has a capacity of 34.4 MWp making it the largest Solar Park in the state of Baden-Württemberg. The second phase of 7.25 MWp was completed in December 2010, and it was expanded to 29.5 MW and then to 34.4 MW, with over 120,000 modules being fitted in December. Ernsthof East is 6.8 MW and Ernsthof West is 27.5 MW. Ernsthof is part of the Tauberlandpark, a planned 72 MW solar park consisting of Ernsthof and Solarpark Gickelfeld (28 MW), which has been delayed due to the political uncertainty of solar parks of over 10 MW receiving the FIT. They may need, instead, to sign a Power Purchase Agreement with the grid distribution power company, which is better than subdividing large projects into multiple smaller segments just to qualify for the FIT.

See also

List of photovoltaic power stations

References

Photovoltaic power stations in Germany
2010 establishments in Germany